Hoh Nuur, located in Dornod Province, is a lake and the lowest point in Mongolia at .

References

Lakes of Mongolia